Gustave Paul Lacapelle was a French Général de Corps d'Armée of World War I. He was known for commanding the 1st and 13th Army Corps and for his participation during the Battle of Soissons. He was also a recipient of the Grand Officer of the Legion of Honor.

Early Military Career
Gustave was born in Troyes, Aube as the son of the French officer Albert Auguste Nicolas Lacapelle and Marguerite Charlotte du Houx. He graduated in November 1900 and ranked 17th out of 80 but remained as a trainee until February 1903 after serving with the 85th Infantry Regiment.

World War I
From November 1903 to June 1905, he served in the 2nd RTA in Algeria and, on May 1, he served in the Sahara. Returning to mainland France to the staff of the 25th Infantry Division and later to the 25th Infantry Regiment. He was promoted to battalion chief in November 1909 and assigned to the 91st Infantry Regiment then to the command of the 4th Army Corps on Christmas 1911 and was made a Chevalier of the Legion of Honor on 30 December 1911. While commanding the "Chasseurs de Saint-Nicolas", World War I broke out and Lacapelle experienced his first active combat at the Battle of Lorraine in August 1914. Promoted to Lieutenant-Colonel on 3 September 1914, he commanded the 37th Infantry Regiment until his promotion to the rank of colonel and was made an officer of the Legion of Honor on 24 November 1914, with the following citation:

From March 1915, he commanded the 4th Chasseurs Brigade on an interim basis until October as he was then made the Chief of Staff of the 7th Army but suffered a car accident from which he came out with his foot burnt. In May 1916, Lacapelle was promoted to Brigadier General on a temporary basis and commanded the 66th Infantry Division on an interim basis. He then became a Général de Division on a temporary basis in April 1917 and he took command of the 1st Army Corps. During the final months of World War I, he participated at the Battle of Saint-Mihiel and the Meuse–Argonne offensive. He permanently became a Général de Division in March 1919 and was placed at the head of the 28th Infantry Division while provisionally commanding the 13th Army Corps two months later.

On 1 August 1919 he was appointed commander of the 1st Army Corps and the 1st Military Region at Lille and remained so until 4 June 1929, when he became Military Governor of Metz, commanding the 6th Military Region. Lacapelle also became a recipient of the Commander of the Legion of Honor in June 1920. He made his official entry into his new stronghold on July 8 and was made Grand Officer of the Legion of Honor on 25 December 1929.

Later Years
He left the service in October 1931 after being made Grand Cross of the Legion of Honor. He then became president of Le Souvenir français. As such, he organized the census of the graves of the 100,000 soldiers who died during the Battle of France in order to maintain them but he died on 15 February 1942 in Paris. General Lacapelle is buried at the Père Lachaise Cemetery at the 94th division.

References

1869 births
1942 deaths
French military personnel of World War I
People from Troyes
French generals
Grand Officiers of the Légion d'honneur
Commandeurs of the Légion d'honneur
Chevaliers of the Légion d'honneur
Officiers of the Légion d'honneur
École Spéciale Militaire de Saint-Cyr alumni